Kurier Poranny ("Morning Courier") is a daily newspaper in Białystok and the Podlasie region of Poland. It was founded in 1990. There are two other newspapers in Białystok, Gazeta Współczesna and Teraz Białystok.

Supplements 
Monday: Moje auto (My car)
Tuesday: Praca i nauka (Jobs and schools)
Wednesday: Mój dom i nieruchomości (My house and properties)
Thursday: Weekend (Weekend)
Friday: Album Białostocki (Bialystok Album)
Saturday: Pupile (Pupils)

Daily newspapers published in Poland
Mass media in Białystok